"Grace" is a short story by James Joyce written toward the end of 1905 and published in his 1914 collection Dubliners.

Plot summary
The story begins with an unconscious man who has fallen down the stairs in a pub after heavy drinking. A friend of his, Mr. Power, finds him, reveals him to be named Tom Kernan, and takes him home to his wife. Kernan is a salesman who once possessed an easy charm and manner but has since descended into alcoholism. An injury to his tongue sustained during the fall keeps Kernan in bed.

Two days later, he is visited by his friends Power, M’Coy, and Cunningham. The friends have concocted a plan to get Kernan to attend a Catholic retreat with them. The four discuss many matters and finally settle upon religion. The friends mention going to a confessional retreat at a Jesuit church and invite Kernan along. He does not respond to the idea at first. The conversation shows a superficial understanding of faith, and the friends make many comical errors about the church.

The scene shifts to the Jesuit church in Gardiner Street where all are listening to a priest’s  sermonizing.

Analysis 
Kernan's gin-drinking in the novel "Ulysses" (which is set on 16 June 1904) indicates the failure of his friends' plan. According to Stanislaus Joyce, the three parts of the story recall the tripartite structure of Dante's Divine Comedy ("inferno-purgatorio-paradiso").

References

Joyce, James. Dubliners (London: Grant Richards, 1914)
Allen, Walter. "The Short Story in English" (Clarendon Press. Oxford, 1981)

External links
 

Short stories by James Joyce
1914 short stories